Stefanie Schwaiger (born 7 August 1986) is a female beach volleyball player from Austria.

She is the sister of Doris Schwaiger, and they are the team Schwaiger – Schwaiger in international beach volleyball.  The sisters, born a year apart, represented Austria at the 2008 Summer Olympics in Beijing, China and the 2012 Summer Olympics in London, Great Britain.  They finished 5th in both tournaments.  At the 2008 Summer Olympics they lost 2 – 0 to Tian Jia and Wang Jie of China in the quarterfinals while at the 2012 Summer Olympics they lost in the quarterfinals 2–0 to Zhang Xi and Xue Chen, also of China.

References

External links

 
 
 
 The Schwaiger teams's Website

1986 births
Living people
Austrian beach volleyball players
Women's beach volleyball players
Beach volleyball players at the 2008 Summer Olympics
Beach volleyball players at the 2012 Summer Olympics
Olympic beach volleyball players of Austria
Sportspeople from Vienna